Gigi in Jazz is an album by American jazz trumpeter and arranger Shorty Rogers performing jazz adaptations of songs composed by Frederick Loewe and Alan Jay Lerner for the film Gigi which was released by RCA Victor  in 1958.

Reception

Allmusic awarded the album 4 stars.

Track listing 
All compositions by Frederick Loewe and Alan Jay Lerner.

 "The Night They Invented Champagne" - 4:04
 "I Remember It Well" - 5:00
 "I'm Glad I'm Not Young Anymore" - 3:32
 "She's Not Thinking of Me" - 6:05
 "Say a Prayer for Me Tonight" - 4:50
 "It's a Bore" - 4:54
 "Thank Heaven for Little Girls" - 3:49
 "Gigi" - 4:33

Recorded in Los Angeles, CA on January 27, 1958 (tracks 2, 3, 5 & 7) and January 30, 1958 (tracks 1, 4, 6 & 8)

Personnel 
Shorty Rogers - trumpet, flugelhorn, arranger
Bill Holman - tenor saxophone
Pete Jolly - piano
Larry Bunker - vibraphone
Buddy Clark (tracks 1, 4, 6 & 8), Ralph Peña (tracks 2, 3, 5 & 7) - bass 
Mel Lewis - drums

References 

Shorty Rogers albums
1958 albums
RCA Records albums
Albums arranged by Shorty Rogers